Tonino Ricci (23 October 1927 – 9 March 2014), sometimes credited as Anthony Richmond, was an Italian film director and screenwriter. Ricci was born Teodoro Ricci in Rome on October 23, 1927. He began working in film as an assistant director in the early 1960s and is credited in such films as The Mercenaries (1961), Sword of the Conqueror (1961), and Superargo and the Faceless Giants (1968). He made his directorial debut with the 1969 war film Salt in the Wound.

Ricci died March 9, 2014, in Rome.

Filmography

Assistant director

 The Mercenaries (1961)
 Sword of the Conqueror (1961)
 Vacanze alla Baia d'Argento (1961)
 Erik the Conqueror (1961)
 Conquest of the Normans (1962)
 Thor and the Amazon Women (1963)
 E Mezzzanotte...Butta Giu il Cadavere (1966)
 10,000 Dollars for a Massacre (1967)
 Superargo and the Faceless Giants (1968)
 God Made Them...I Kill Them (1968)
 Ciccio Forgives, I Don't (1968)
 The Nephews of Zorror (1968)
 White Fang (1973)
 Challenge to White Fang (1974)

As director
 The Liberators (1969)
 Cross Current (1971)
 Great Treasure Hunt (1971)
 Colpo Grosso.. Grossissimo...Anzi Probabile (1972)
 The Big Family (1973)
 Karate, Fists and Beans (1973)
 Bad Kids of the West (1973)
 White Fang to the Rescue (1974)
 Storia di Arcieri, Pugni e Occhi Neri (1976)
 Delirio d'Amore (1977)
 Pasion (film, 1977) (1977)
 The Shark's Cave (1978)
 Encounter in the Deep (1979)
 Panic (1982)
 Thor the Conqueror (1983)
 Rush (1983)
 A Man Called Rage (1984)
 Days of Hell (1986)
 Night of the Sharks (1988)
 Predators of the Magic Stone (1988)
 Buck and the Magic Bracelet (1998)

References

External links

Italian film directors
Giallo film directors
1927 births
2014 deaths
Italian film producers
Films directed by Tonino Ricci
People from Rome